Cabela's Big Game Hunter II is a hunting video game published by HeadGames Publishing, Inc. It is a sequel to Cabela's Big Game Hunter, and was released in 1998.

Gameplay
Upon starting the game, the player can create an on-screen character and begin with some amount of money to buy permits, weapons and hunting gear. By correctly shooting the animal with a permit, a screen detailing the vital signs of it is shown, and the player will receive some money. The game uses a 360 degree circle movement where scents and calls can be used for attracting animals. There are four locations in the game: Colorado, Canada, New Mexico, and an African safari.

Reception

Big Game Hunter II achieved global sales of 350,000 units by February 1999. The game received "unfavorable" reviews according to video game review aggregator GameRankings.

Expansion pack
Cabela's Big Game Hunter II: Open Season is an expansion pack for the original game. It released in 1998, featuring a range of new weapons, ammunition, animals, authentic Cabela's hunting gear and a new map.

References

External links

1998 video games
Windows games
Windows-only games
Cabela's video games
Video games developed in the United States